Andreas Haider-Maurer is the defending champion, and successfully defended his championship by defeating Gerald Melzer in all-Austrian final by a score of 6–7(9–11), 6–4, 6–2.

Seeds

Draw

Finals

Top half

Bottom half

References
 Main Draw
 Qualifying Draw

BRD Brasov Challenger - Singles
BRD Brașov Challenger
2013 in Romanian tennis